In linguistic typology, a null-subject language is a language whose grammar permits an independent clause to lack an explicit subject; such a clause is then said to have a null subject.

In the principles and parameters framework, the null subject is controlled by the pro-drop parameter, which is either on or off for a particular language.

Typically, null-subject languages express person, number, and/or gender agreement with the referent on the verb, rendering a subject noun phrase redundant.

For example, in Italian the subject "she" can be either explicit or implicit:

The subject "(s)he" of the second sentence is only implied in Italian. English and French, on the other hand, require an explicit subject in this sentence.

Of the thousands of languages in the world, a considerable number are null-subject languages, from a wide diversity of unrelated language families. They include Albanian, Arabic, Basque, Berber, Bengali, Catalan/Valencian, Chinese, Estonian, Finnish, Galician, Gujarati, Greek, Hebrew, Hindi, Hungarian, Italian,  Romanian, Japanese, Korean, Maltese, Nepali,  Persian, Portuguese, Punjabi,  Sindhi, Slavic languages, Spanish, Tamil and the Turkic languages, as well as most languages related to these, and many others still. In fact, it is rather the absence of pronoun dropping that is an areal feature of Standard Average European, including French, German, and English.

Characterization

Languages which are not null-subject languages usually require an explicit subject. English and French make an exception for the imperative mood, or where a subject is mentioned in the same sentence, one immediately preceding it, or where the subject is implied. These languages can sometimes drop pronouns in limited contexts: e.g, German for "please", Bitte, literally means "[I] beg", and in English "Am not happy" or even "Not happy!" would be clearly understood as the first person singular "I am not happy". Similarly, in some cases the additional inclusion of pronouns in English has equivalent force to their optional inclusion in Spanish or Italian: e.g, "I cook, I wash up and I do the shopping" is more emphatic than simply "I cook, wash up and do the shopping".

Subjects may sometimes be dropped in colloquial speech where the subject is implied

In the framework of government and binding theory of syntax, the term null subject refers to an empty category. The empty category in question is thought to behave like an ordinary pronoun with respect to anaphoric reference and other grammatical behavior. Hence it is most commonly referred to as "pro".

This phenomenon is similar, but not identical, to that of pro-drop languages, which may omit pronouns, including subject pronouns, but also object pronouns. While all pro-drop languages are null-subject languages, not all null-subject languages are pro-drop.

In null-subject languages that have verb inflection in which the verb inflects for person, the grammatical person of the subject is reflected by the inflection of the verb and likewise for number and gender.

Examples

The following examples come from Portuguese:

"I'm going home" can be translated either as "" or as "", where "eu" means "I".
In Portuguese, as in most other Romance languages (but not all, French is a notable exception), there is no exact equivalent for the pronoun it. However, some older persons say  (European Portuguese) which directly translates to "He is raining".
"I'm going home. I'm going to watch TV" would not, except in exceptional circumstances, be translated as  At least the subject of the second sentence should be omitted in Portuguese unless one wishes to express emphasis, as to emphasize the I.

As the examples illustrate, in many null-subject languages, personal pronouns exist and can be used for emphasis but are dropped whenever they can be inferred from the context. Some sentences do not allow a subject in any form while, in other cases an explicit subject without particular emphasis, would sound awkward or unnatural.

Most Bantu languages are null-subject.

Arabic
Arabic is considered a null-subject language, as demonstrated by the following example:

Subject information for 'you' and 'he' is encoded in the conjugations of the verbs ساعِد and يساعد

Azerbaijani

Bulgarian

Catalan/Valencian
In Catalan/Valencian, as in Spanish, Portuguese, Galician, etc., the subject is also encoded in the verb conjugation. Pronoun use is not obligatory.
 (Nosaltres) Anem a la platja: We go to the beach.
 (Tu) Ets la meva amiga: You are my friend.
 (Vostès/vosaltres) No són/sou benvinguts aquí: You are not welcome here.
 (Ells) Estan dormint: They are asleep.
 (Jo) Necessito ajuda: I need help.
 (Ell) És a la seva habitació: He is in his bedroom.
 (Ella) Està cansada: She is tired.

In Catalan/Valencian, one may choose whether to use the subject or not. If used in an inclined tone, it may be seen as an added emphasis; however, in colloquial speaking, usage of a pronoun is optional. Even so, sentences with a null subject are used more frequently than sentences with a subject. In some cases, it is even necessary to skip the subject to create a grammatically correct sentence.

Chinese
Most varieties of Chinese tend to be non-null-subject. Verbs in Chinese languages are not conjugated, so it is not possible to determine the subject based on the verb alone. However, in certain circumstances, most Chinese varieties allow dropping of the subject, thus forming null-subject sentences. One of the instances where the subject would be removed is when the subject is known. Below is an example in Mandarin:

The above example clearly shows that a speaker could omit the subject if the doer of the verb is known. In a Chinese imperative sentence, like the first text, the subject is also left out.

Galician
In Galician, as in Spanish, Portuguese, Catalan, etc., the subject is also encoded in the verb conjugation. Pronoun use is not obligatory.
 (Nós) Imos á praia: We go to the beach.
 (Ti) E-la miña amiga: You are my friend. (Informal singular)
 (Vós) Non sodes benvidos aquí: You are not welcome here. (Informal Plural)
 (Eles) Están durmindo: They are sleeping.
 (Eu) Necesito axuda: I need help.
 (El) Está no seu cuarto: He is in his bedroom.
 (Ela) Está cansada: She is tired.

In Galician, one may choose whether to use the subject or not. If used in an inclined tone, it may be seen as an added emphasis; however, in colloquial speaking, usage of a pronoun is optional. Even so, sentences with a null subject are used more frequently than sentences with a subject. In some cases, it is even necessary to skip the subject to create a grammatically correct sentence.

Modern Greek

Hebrew
Hebrew is considered a partially null-subject language, as demonstrated by the following example:

Subjects can usually be omitted only when the verb is conjugated for grammatical person, as in the third-person plural in the example above.
In Hebrew one can also construct null-subject sentences as in the Latin and Turkish language examples: "We/you/they are going to the beach" can be expressed as "holkhim la-yam" (הולכים לים), lit. "Are going to the beach." This is truly a null-subject construction.

As in Spanish and Turkish, though, Hebrew conjugates verbs in accordance with specific pronouns, so "we went to the beach" is technically just as much a null-subject construction as in the other languages, but in fact the conjugation does indicate the subject pronoun: "Halakhnu la-yam" (הלכנו לים), lit. "Went (we) to the beach." The word "halakhnu" means "we went", just as the Spanish and Turkish examples indicate the relevant pronoun as the subject in their conjugation. So these should perhaps not be considered to be true null-subject phrases. Potentially confusing the issue further is the fact that Hebrew word order can also make some sentences appear to be null-subject, when the subject is in fact given after the verb. For instance, "it's raining" is expressed "yored geshem" (יורד גשם), which means "descends rain"; "rain" is the subject. The phrases meaning "It's snowing" and "It's hailing" are formed in the same way.

Hindi 
Hindi shows radical pro-drop. This type of pro-drop differs from pro-drop in languages like Spanish where pro-drop is licensed by rich verbal morphology. Radical pro-drop is possible only in NP languages. South Asian languages such as Hindi, in general, have the ability to pro-drop any and all arguments. Here, the case is expressed in a morpheme that is independent from the stem, making the pro-drop possible.

Italian

The conjugations of the root verbs (faccio for fare; chiama for chiamare) already imply the subject of the sentences.

Japanese
Japanese and several other null-subject languages are topic-prominent languages; some of these languages require an expressed topic in order for sentences to make sense. In Japanese, for example, it is possible to start a sentence with a topic marked by the particle wa, and in subsequent sentences leave the topic unstated, as it is understood to remain the same, until another one is either explicitly or implicitly introduced. For example, in the second sentence below, the subject ("we") is not expressed again but left implicit:

In other cases, the topic can be changed without being explicitly stated, as in the following example, where the topic changes implicitly from "today" to "I".

It is also common for Japanese to omit things which are obvious in context. If the above line were part of a conversation about considering purchasing the game, it could be further shortened to:

Latin
Verb-conjugation endings in Latin express number and person (as well as tense and mood).

Macedonian

Polish

In Polish, the subject is omitted almost every time, although it can be present to put emphasis on the subject.

Russian

Sindhi

With subjects: آئون آيس، مون ڏٺو، آئون، کٽيس
Idiomatic translation: I came, I saw, I conquered.

Spanish
In Spanish, as with Latin and most Romance languages, the subject is encoded in the verb conjugation. Pronoun use is not obligatory.
 : I need help.
 : You (informal) are my friend.
 : You (informal) are my friend.
 : You (formal) see me / She sees me.
 : He is in his bedroom.
 : She is tired.
 : We go to the beach.
 : You (plural, informal) should leave.
 : You (plural) are not welcome here.
 : They are asleep.
 : They (feminine) go there.
 : Do I have to pay this empanadilla?

In Spanish, for the most part one may choose whether to use the subject or not. Generally if a subject is provided, it is either for clarity or for emphasis. Sentences with a null subject are used more frequently than sentences with a subject.

Tamil
Verb conjugations in Tamil incorporate suffixes for number (singular and plural) and person (1st, 2nd and 3rd), and also for gender (masculine, feminine and neuter) in the third person. An explicit subject, therefore, is unnecessary, and can be inferred from the verb conjugation.

Tamil script: முடிந்துவிட்டது Transliteration: muḍinduviṭṭaduLiteral Translation: It has left, having ended.Idiomatic Translation: It has come to an end.

Another example:

Turkish

Impersonal constructions

In some cases (impersonal constructions), a proposition has no referent at all. Pro-drop languages deal naturally with these, whereas many non-pro-drop languages such as English and French must fill in the syntactic gap by inserting a dummy pronoun. "*Rains" is not a correct sentence; a dummy "it" must be added: "It rains"; in French "Il pleut". In most Romance languages, however, "Rains" can be a sentence: Spanish "Llueve", Italian "Piove", Catalan "Plou", Portuguese "Chove", Romanian "Plouă", etc. Uralic and Slavic languages also show this trait: Finnish "Sataa", Hungarian "Esik"; Polish "Pada".

There are constructed languages that are not pro-drop but do not require this syntactic gap to be filled. For example, in Esperanto, "He made the cake" would translate as Li faris la kukon (never *Faris la kukon), but It rained yesterday would be Pluvis hieraŭ (not *Ĝi pluvis hieraŭ).

Null subjects in non-null-subject languages
Other languages (sometimes called non-null-subject languages) require each sentence to include a subject: this is the case for most Germanic languages, including English and German, as well as many other languages. French, though a Romance language, also requires a subject. In some cases—particularly in English, less so in German, and occasionally in French—colloquial expressions allow for the omission of the subject in a manner similar to that of Spanish or Russian:

"[It] Sounds good." 
"[I] Bumped into George this morning." 
"[We] Agreed to have a snifter to catch up on old times." 
"[You] Went down to Brighton for the weekend?"

The imperative form
Even in such non-null-subject languages such as English, it is standard for clauses in the imperative mood to lack explicit subjects; for example:
"Take a break—you're working too hard."
"Shut up!"
"Don't listen to him!"

An explicit declaration of the pronoun in the imperative mood is typically reserved for emphasis:
"You stay away!"
"Don't you listen to him!"

French and German offer less flexibility with respect to null subjects. 

In French, it is neither grammatically correct nor possible to include the subject within the imperative form; the vous in the expression taisez-vous stems from the fact that se taire, "to be silent," is a reflexive verb and is thus the object with similar meaning to "yourself" in an English imperative.

In German, the pronoun (singular du or plural ihr) is normally omitted from the informal second-person imperative (Mach das, "Do it"), although it may be added in a colloquial manner for emphasis (Macht ihr das!, "You [guys] do it!"). By contrast, the addressee-specific formal imperative requires the addition of the pronoun Sie (as in Machen Sie das!, "Do it, [sir/ma'am]!") to avoid confusion with the otherwise morphologically identical infinitive, whereas the addressee-nonspecific or "neutral" formal imperative omits the pronoun and moves the verb to final position (as in Bitte nicht stören, "Please do not disturb"). On the other hand, the pronoun wir is always included in the first-person plural imperative (Machen wir das!, "Let's do it!"), with the verb appearing in first position to differentiate the imperative from the indicative mood, wherein the verb appears in second position (as in Wir machen das, "We're doing it").

Auxiliary languages 

Many international auxiliary languages, while not officially pro-drop, permit pronoun omission with some regularity.

Interlingua
In Interlingua, pronoun omission is most common with the pronoun il, which means "it" when referring to part of a sentence or to nothing in particular. Examples of this word include
Il pluvia.
It's raining.
Il es ver que ille arriva deman.
It is true that he arrives tomorrow.

Il tends to be omitted whenever the contraction "it's" can be used in English. Thus, il may be omitted from the second sentence above: "Es ver que ille arriva deman". In addition, subject pronouns are sometimes omitted when they can be inferred from a previous sentence:

Illa audiva un crito. Curreva al porta. Aperiva lo.
She heard a cry. Ran to the door. Opened it.

Esperanto
Similarly, Esperanto sometimes exhibits pronoun deletion in casual use. This deletion is normally limited to subject pronouns, especially where the pronoun has been used just previously:

In "official" use, however, Esperanto admits of null-subject sentences in two cases only:
 (optional) in the 2nd person imperative (N.B. The Esperanto imperative is often named "volitive" instead, since it can be conjugated with a subject in any person, and also used in subordinate clauses)
 Venu! Come!
 Vi venu! You [there], come [with me]! (pronoun added for emphasis)
 For "impersonal verbs" which have no semantic subject. In English or French, an "empty" subject is nevertheless required:
 Pluvas. It is raining. FR: Il pleut.
 Estas nun somero. It is summer now. FR: C'est l'été à présent.
 Estas vere, ke li alvenos morgaŭ. It is true that he will arrive tomorrow. FR: C'est vrai qu'il arrivera demain.
 (In this latter case, the sentence is not really no-subject, since "ke li alvenos morgaŭ" ("that he will arrive tomorrow") is the subject.)

Contrary to the Interlingua example above, and as in English, a repeated subject can normally be omitted only within a single sentence:
 Ŝi aŭdis krion. Ŝi kuris al la pordo. Ŝi malfermis ĝin.
 She heard a shout. She ran to the door. She opened it.
 Ŝi aŭdis krion, kuris al la pordo kaj malfermis ĝin.
 She heard a shout, ran to the door and opened it.

See also

Notes

Bibliography
 Alexiadou, Artemis 2006. Uniform and non-uniform aspects of pro-drop languages. In Arguments and agreement, ed. P. Ackema, P. Brandt, M. Schoorlemmer & F. Weerman, 127-158. Oxford: Oxford University Press.  
 Barbosa, Pilar MEL Duarte, and M Kato. (2005) Null Subjects in European and Brazilian Portuguese.  Journal of Portuguese Linguistics. 
 Biberauer, Theresa, Anders Holmberg, Ian Roberts and Michele Sheehan (eds). 2010. Parametric Variation: Null subjects in Minimalist Theory. Cambridge: Cambridge University Press.
 Cook, Manuela. (1997) A Theory for the Interpretation of Forms of Address in the Portuguese Language. Hispania, Vol 80, Nº 3, AATSP, USA
 Chomsky, Noam 1981. Lectures on government and binding. Studies in Generative Grammar 9. Dordrecht: Foris.
 Chomsky, Noam 1982. Concepts and Consequences of the Theory of Government and Binding. The MIT Press, Cambridge, Mass.
 D’Alessandro, Roberta. 2014. The Null Subject Parameter: Where are we and where are we headed? Ms. Leiden University Centre for Linguistics.
 Gilligan, Gary Martin. 1987. “A crosslinguistic approach to prodrop parameter.” PhD. dissertation, University of Southern California, Los Angeles.
 Holmberg, Anders. 2005. “Is there a little pro? Evidence from Finnish.” Linguistic Inquiry 36:533-564.
 Jaeggli, Oswaldo and Ken Safir 1987 (eds) The null subject parameter. Dordrecht: Kluwer.
 Kučerová, Ivona 2014. “The Syntax of Null Subjects.” Syntax 17:2, 132167.
 Perlmutter, David 1971. Deep and surface constraints in syntax. New York: Holt, Rinehart and Winston.
 Rizzi, Luigi  1986. 'Null Objects in Italian and the Theory of pro' Linguistic Inquiry 17:1986. pp. 501-557.
 Rizzi, Luigi 1982. Issues in Italian Syntax, Foris Publications, Dordrecht.
 Vikner, Sten. 1995. Verb Movement and Expletive Subjects in the Germanic Languages, Oxford University Press, Oxford.
 Zanuttini, Raffaella. 2008. Microcomparative syntax in English verbal agreement. Talk at NELS 39, November 2008.

External links
 List of languages including pro-drop (PD) or non-pro-drop (NPD) status, which is usually related to null-subject or non-null-subject status.

Linguistic typology